Jody Upshaw (born 2003) is a Canadian R&B artist.

Career 
At age 14 in 2018, Upshaw released her debut EP. Upshaw released the single "Glitter and Gold" with teen rapper Shay Pitts that same year. Upshaw's single "Straight Shooter" was produced by Classified and released in 2018. In 2022, the song was featured in the season two premiere of Euphoria.

Upshaw was featured in the 2020 documentary short, "Youth Hiphop and Halifax", written and directed by Harmony Adesola for the Being Black in Halifax series. Upshaw was named Music Nova Scotia's artist in residence in 2022.

Personal life 
Upshaw is originally from Lower Sackville, Nova Scotia. She began singing and performing when she was eleven. Her father, Martin, was a rapper who performed under the name KL.

Awards and nominations

References 

2003 births
Living people
Canadian rhythm and blues musicians
Musicians from Halifax, Nova Scotia
21st-century Canadian women musicians